William Caspar Graustein (15 November 1888 – 22 January 1941) was an American mathematician. He graduated magna cum laude from Harvard University in 1910 and later became an instructor at Harvard University. In 1921, he married Mary Curtis Graustein (1884—1972), who was the first American woman to earn a mathematics Ph.D. (1917) from Radcliffe College.

He died in an automobile accident, at the age of 52. At the time, Graustein was professor of mathematics and assistant dean at Harvard.

Bibliography 

Some of his books and papers are:

 The scientific work of Joseph Lipka
 Applicability with preservation of both curvatures
 Extensions of the four-vertex theorem
 Introduction to higher geometry
 ''Differential Geometry" MacMillan Company 1935. Republished Dover 1966 2006.

References

External links
 
 

1888 births
1941 deaths
20th-century American mathematicians
Harvard University alumni
Harvard University faculty